Mohammad Abdul Qadir is a Pakistani politician who is currently serving as a member of the Senate of Pakistan from the Balochistan since March 2021. He won Independently and later joined Pakistan Tehreek-e-Insaf.

References

Living people

Year of birth missing (living people)
Pakistani Senators 2021–2027
Pakistan Tehreek-e-Insaf politicians